The James Kerr House is a home in Savannah, Georgia, United States. It is located at 20 West Jones Street and was constructed in 1849. 

Built for James Ker (possibly Kerr), the building is part of the Savannah Historic District. 
In a survey for the Historic Savannah Foundation, Mary Lane Morrison found the building to be of significant status.

See also
Buildings in Savannah Historic District

References

Houses in Savannah, Georgia
Houses completed in 1849
Savannah Historic District